Hippa is a genus of decapod crustaceans in the family Hippidae, containing the following species:

Hippa adactyla Fabricius, 1787
Hippa admirabilis Thallwitz, 1892
Hippa alcimede de Man, 1902
Hippa australis Hale, 1927
Hippa carcineutes Holthuis & Manning, 1970
Hippa celaeno de Man, 1896
Hippa granulatus Borradaile, 1904
Hippa hirtipes Dana, 1852
Hippa indica Haig, Murugan & Balakrishnan Nair, 1986
Hippa marmorata Hombron & Jacquinot, 1846
Hippa ovalis A. Milne-Edwards, 1862
Hippa picta Heller, 1861
Hippa strigillata Stimpson, 1860
Hippa testudinaria Herbst, 1791
Hippa truncatifrons Miers, 1878

It is closely related to the genus Emerita, and species have often been transferred between the two genera.

References

Hippoidea